Peter Žonta (born 9 January 1979) is a Slovenian former ski jumper who competed from 1995 to 2007. He won a bronze medal at the 2002 Winter Olympics in Salt Lake City in the team large hill event, and also won an individual large hill World Cup event in Innsbruck in 2004.

External links

 
 

1979 births
Living people
Skiers from Ljubljana
Slovenian male ski jumpers
Ski jumpers at the 1998 Winter Olympics
Ski jumpers at the 2002 Winter Olympics
Olympic ski jumpers of Slovenia
Olympic bronze medalists for Slovenia
Olympic medalists in ski jumping
Medalists at the 2002 Winter Olympics